Lori M. Stone (born January 1980) is an American politician and teacher in Michigan. Stone is a Democratic member of Michigan House of Representatives from District 28.

Early life 
Stone was born in Warren, Michigan. Stone's parents are educators. Stone graduated from Fitzgerald Public Schools and Macomb Mathematics Science Technology Center.

Education 
Stone earned a bachelor's degree in Political Theory & Constitution Democracy/Elementary Education from Michigan State University. Stone earned a master's degree in Science Education from Michigan State University. In 2017, Stone graduated from the Michigan Political Leadership Program (MPLP) from Michigan State University. Stone completed the Emerge Women's Boot Camp for Michigan.

Career 
Stone was a teacher at Mound Park Elementary School in the Fitzgerald Public Schools District in Macomb County, Michigan. Stone has fourteen years of experience in the classroom as a teacher. Stone is a member of Michigan Education Association (MEA).

In the August 2016 primary election, Stone was seeking for a seat for Michigan House of Representatives for District 28. Stone was defeated by Patrick Green. Stone lost with 30.71% of the votes.

In August 2018, Stone defeated incumbent Patrick Green and won the primary election for Michigan House of Representatives for District 28.

On November 6, 2018, Stone won the election and became a member of the Michigan House of Representatives for District 28. Stone defeated Aaron Delikta and Ryan Manier with 62.97% of the votes.

In legislation, Stone is a member of several committees including Education Committee, Financial Services Committee, and Health Policy Committee.

Stone was a pledged delegate for Joe Biden at the 2020 Michigan Democratic presidential primary.

Personal life 
Stone is a resident of Warren, Michigan.

See also 
 2018 Michigan House of Representatives election

References

External links 
 Lori M. Stone at ballotpedia.org
 Lori Stone at housedems.com
 Mound Park Elementary School at greatschools.org

Living people
21st-century American politicians
21st-century American women politicians
Democratic Party members of the Michigan House of Representatives
Michigan State University alumni
Women state legislators in Michigan
People from Warren, Michigan
1980 births